The Nepal Independent Workers Union (NIWU) was a Nepalese trade union formed in 1979 as the labour wing of Communist Party of Nepal (Marxist-Leninist). 

It was created following a General Strike in Balaju Industrial District, Kathmandu and existed as a separate entity until 1989 when it helped form the General Federation of Nepalese Trade Unions.

Notes and references 

Trade unions in Nepal
Trade unions established in 1979
Trade unions disestablished in 1989
1979 establishments in Nepal